Grødem Church is a parish church of the Church of Norway in Randaberg Municipality in Rogaland county, Norway. It is located in the village of Grødem. It is one of the two churches for the Randaberg parish which is part of the Tungenes prosti (deanery) in the Diocese of Stavanger. The gray concrete church was built in a semi-circular design in 2000 using designs by the architect Ove Morten Berge. The church seats about 450 people. The church was consecrated on 28 May 2000 by the Bishop Ernst Baasland.

See also
List of churches in Rogaland

References

Randaberg
Churches in Rogaland
21st-century Church of Norway church buildings
Churches completed in 2000
2000 establishments in Norway